A Common Crime is a 2020 Argentine drama film directed by Francisco Márquez. It was selected to be shown in the Panorama section at the 70th Berlin International Film Festival.

Cast
 Elisa Carricajo as Cecilia
 Mecha Martinez as Nebe
 Eliot Otazo as Kevin
 Ciro Coien Pardo as Juan
 Cecilia Rainero as Claudia

References

External links
 

2020 films
2020 drama films
Argentine drama films
2020s Spanish-language films